Events from the year 1963 in Pakistan.

Incumbents 
President: Ayub Khan
Chief Justice: A.R. Cornelius

Events 
July – Foreign Minister Zulfiqar Ali Bhutto stated in Pakistan's National Assembly that Pakistan could rely on Chinese assistance in the event of a further India-Pakistan war.

December - Prominent Pakistani-Bengali politician Huseyn Shaheed Suhrawardy dies in Lebanon.

See also
 List of Pakistani films of 1963

References

 
1963 in Asia